Nawish is a crater on Ceres. It is named after the Acoma guardian of the field.

References

Impact craters on asteroids
Surface features of Ceres